Semănătorul (Romanian for "The Sower") was the name of several magazines in Romania, including:

Sămănătorul (or Semănătorul), published in Bucharest
Semănătorul (1870–1876), published in Bârlad